The Bayerisches Zuchtrennen is a Group 1 flat horse race in Germany open to thoroughbreds aged three years or older. It is run at Munich over a distance of 2,000 metres (about 1¼ miles), and it is scheduled to take place each year on the last Sunday in July.

History
The event was established in 1866, and it was originally restricted to three-year-olds.

It was known as the Grosser Dreijährigen-Zuchtpreis from 1940 to 1944, and as the Bayerisches Derby in 1947.

The present race grading system was introduced in Germany in 1972, and the Bayerisches Zuchtrennen was initially classed at Group 3 level. It was opened to older horses and promoted to Group 2 in 1985. It was given Group 1 status in 1990.

The race has been sponsored by Dallmayr since 1996, and it is now run as the Grosser Dallmayr-Preis.

Records
Most successful horse (2 wins):
 Turfkönig – 1989, 1990
 Soldier Hollow – 2005, 2007

Leading jockey since 1900 (7 wins):
 Fritz Drechsler – Grossmogul (1948), Levantos (1953), Liebeschor (1962), Daimyo (1967), Bacchus (1968), Boris (1972), Mirando (1973)

Leading trainer since 1940 (8 wins):
 Heinz Jentzsch – Daimyo (1967), Bacchus (1968), Boris (1972), Mirando (1973), Index (1981), Anno (1982), Lirung (1985), Zampano (1987)

Leading owner since 1900 (9 wins): (includes part ownership)
 August von Schmieder – Beowulf (1903), Herero (1907), Illo (1909), Pilgramsberg (1910), Don Cesar (1911), Flaminio (1912), Nachtschatten (1913), Drosselbart (1914), Persicus (1915)

Winners since 1970

Earlier winners

 1890: Bettelliese
 1900: Heribert / Minnesänger *
 1901: Epirus
 1902: Herz Ass
 1903: Beowulf
 1904: Girlamund
 1905: Notgrim
 1906: Elsterstein
 1907: Herero
 1908: Bajazzo
 1909: Illo
 1910: Pilgramsberg
 1911: Don Cesar
 1912: Flaminio
 1913: Nachtschatten
 1914: Drosselbart
 1915: Persicus
 1916: Der Blaue Vogel
 1917: Rosengarten
 1918: Eiffilo
 1919: Eggenfelden
 1920: Opanka
 1921: Paukenschläger
 1922: Casanova
 1923: Bajuvare
 1924: Eigilolf
 1925: Goldelse
 1926: Sigtuna
 1927: Sphaira
 1928: Arber
 1929: Peter Sonnenschein
 1930: Fortunatos
 1931: Esto Vir
 1932–39: no race
 1940: Spieler
 1941: Werber
 1942: Ruhpoldinger
 1943: Lotse
 1944: Vinca
 1945–46: no race
 1947: Singlspieler
 1948: Grossmogul
 1949: Montevideo
 1950: Waldspecht
 1951: Algol
 1952: Alke / Prodomo *
 1953: Levantos
 1954: Fabier
 1955: Masetto
 1956: Plutarch
 1957: Menes
 1958: Ozean
 1959: Bismarck
 1960: Ankerkette
 1961: Rosenwirt
 1962: Liebeschor
 1963: Belos
 1964: Illetlen
 1965: Mioro
 1966: Nem Igaz
 1967: Daimyo
 1968: Bacchus
 1969: Traminer

* The 1900 and 1952 races were dead-heats and have joint winners.

See also

 List of German flat horse races

References
 Racing Post:
 galopp-sieger.de – Großer Dallmayr-Preis (Bayerisches Zuchtrennen).
 horseracingintfed.com – International Federation of Horseracing Authorities – Bayerisches Zuchtrennen (2018).
 pedigreequery.com – Bayerisches Zuchtrennen – München-Riem.

Open middle distance horse races
Horse races in Germany
Recurring sporting events established in 1866
1866 establishments in Bavaria